"Jump" is a song by French-Israeli singer Nadav Guedj. It was released on 1 December 2015 through Unicell as the third single from his debut studio album, Nadav Guedj (2016).

Track listing

Chart performance

Weekly charts

Release history

References

2015 songs
2015 singles